Kevin Outterson is a lawyer, a professor of law and the N. Neal Pike Scholar in Health and Disability Law at Boston University (2014–present). He is also the founding executive director and principal investigator of Combating Antibiotic-Resistant Bacteria Biopharmaceutical Accelerator (CARB-X), a global non-profit partnership that supports companies developing new antibiotics, diagnostics, vaccines and other products to address drug-resistant bacterial infections. CARB-X is funded by the United States, United Kingdom and German governments, Wellcome and the Bill & Melinda Gates Foundation. In 2022, CARB-X received a new commitment of funding from BARDA and Wellcome of up to $370 million. The G7 Health Ministers have cited CARB-X among the critical initiatives to support as the G7 governments renew their 2021 commitment to address the most dangerous drug-resistant infections.

Outterson's research focuses primarily on the law and economics of antibiotic resistance–including push and pull incentives–health law, intellectual property, and global access to medicine.

Outterson has testified before Congress, the World Health Organization (WHO), UK Parliamentary working groups, and for the District of Columbia, Massachusetts, Vermont, California and West Virginia state legislatures.

He is co-director of the health law program at Boston University School of Law (2007–present) and associate fellow at the Royal Institute of International Affairs at Chatham House, London (2014–present). He served on the Board of the American Society of Law, Medicine & Ethics, and serves as faculty editor to the American Journal of Law & Medicine (2007–present). He is past editor-in-chief of the Journal of Law, Medicine & Ethics (2010–2016).

References

External links

"Racing the clock to stop drug-resistant superbugs" The Boston Globe by Maryn McKenna
"Accelerating global innovation to address antibacterial resistance: introducing CARB-X" Nature Reviews Drug Discovery
"Can we prevent antibiotic resistance?" The Brink by Robin Berghaus
"Antibiotic-resistant infections could dwarf the COVID-19 pandemic" The Boston Globe by Kevin Outterson and Henry Skinner
"A better way to fund the fight against superbugs" Bloomberg by James Paton
"The battle against bugs" Boston Business Journal by Rowan Walrath
"Combating Antibiotic-Resistant Bacteria Biopharmaceutical Accelerator (CARB-X)" Progress, Potential, and Possibilities hosted by Ira Pastor
"The Global Burden of AMR" Infectious Conversations hosted by Candace DeMatteis, Partnership to Fight Infectious Disease
"Antibiotic Resistance: How CARB-X Helps New Companies Get a Running Start" The State of Health with Gunnar Esiason

Year of birth missing (living people)
Living people
Boston University faculty
American lawyers
Northwestern University alumni
Medical journal editors